Budhiganga is a Gaupalika (rural municipality) out of eight rural municipality located at Morang district of Province No. 1 of Nepal. There are a total of 17 local body in Morang District in which 1 is metro city, 7 are urban municipality and 7 are rural municipality.

Tankisinuwari, Hathimudha, Sisabanibadahara and Dangraha which previously were all separate Village development committee merged to form this new local level body. Fulfilling the requirement of the new Constitution of Nepal 2015, Ministry of Federal Affairs and Local Development replaced all old VDCs and Municipalities into 753 new local level body (Municipality).

The rural municipality is divided into 7 wards and Headquarter of the rural municipality is situated Hathimudha

External links
Official Website

References 

 
Rural municipalities of Nepal established in 2017
Rural municipalities in Koshi Province
Rural municipalities in Morang District